Francisco Andrés Arancibia Silva (born 12 November 1996) is a Chilean professional footballer who plays as a winger for O'Higgins.

Personal life
He is member of a football family nicknamed "Arancibia Dynasty" since both his father – Leopoldo – and his three uncles – Franz, Eduardo and Roque – were professional footballers.

Honours

Club
O'Higgins
Primera División: 2013–A
Supercopa de Chile: 2014

Palmeiras
Copa do Brasil: 2015

Individual
O'Higgins
Medalla Santa Cruz de Triana: 2014

References

External links
 
 Arancibia at Football Lineups

1996 births
Living people
People from Rancagua
Chilean footballers
Chilean expatriate footballers
O'Higgins F.C. footballers
Universidad de Chile footballers
Sociedade Esportiva Palmeiras players
Coritiba Foot Ball Club players
Esporte Clube São Bento players
Chilean Primera División players
Campeonato Brasileiro Série B players
Chilean expatriate sportspeople in Brazil
Expatriate footballers in Brazil

Association football wingers